Maslin Beach is a southern coastal suburb of Adelaide, South Australia. It is located in the City of Onkaparinga.

The name refers to the town of Maslin Beach, the beach after which it was named and the suburb which contains both. In this article, the name refers to the suburb, unless stated otherwise.

Red Ochre Cove lies south of Ochre Point, which separates Maslin Beach from Moana Beach to the north.

Geography
Maslin Beach is located between Main South Road, which forms the suburbs eastern boundary, and Gulf St Vincent.

Demographics

The 2006 Census by the Australian Bureau of Statistics counted 1,066 persons in Maslin Beach on census night. Of these, 50.6% were male and 49.4% were female.

The majority of residents (68.8%) are of Australian birth, with other common census responses being England (15.8%) and New Zealand (2.2%).

The age distribution of Maslin Beach residents is similar to that of the greater Australian population. 71.7% of residents were over 25 years in 2006, compared to the Australian average of 66.5%; and 28.3% were younger than 25 years, compared to the Australian average of 33.5%.

Community
Local newspapers include The Times and On The Coast.

On 18 April 2012, a 14-year-old boy from Aldinga died after falling 50 metres off a cliff at Maslin Beach

Facilities and attractions

The beach
The most well-known attraction in the suburb is the beach at Maslin Beach. Also known as Maslin's Beach or, simply, Maslin's, the beach is the site of a cliff-lined recreation reserve stretching from Maslin Beach town in the north to Blanche Point in the south.

In 1975, the southern half of the beach was declared Australia's first official nude beach.

The Maslin Beach Nude Olympics are held annually, consisting of informal competitions such as three-legged races and the judging of "best bum". This is now called the Pilwarren Maslin Beach Nude Games.

Parks
There are three parks in Maslin Beach. One is at the top of the stairs, one is on Beachway Avenue and one is on Parkway Avenue located next to the town hall.

Development 
The development of Maslins Beach and adjacent lands for prospective tourism and recreational facilities has been a subject of controversy. In 2014, the Onkaparinga Council rejected the prospect of rezoning lands for the potential development of a marina following objections from residents. The proponent lobbying for rezoning was Nobletech, represented by John Hunt. The Development Assessment Commission's agenda of 14 November 2013 noted that Nobletech wished to develop "a regional tourism hub to promote the natural environment and greater use of Maslin Beach."

Transportation

Roads
Maslin Beach is serviced by Main South Road, connecting the suburb to both Adelaide city centre and the Fleurieu Peninsula.

Public transport
Maslin Beach is serviced by public transport run by the Adelaide Metro.

Notable residents
John F. Davis, artist

See also

List of Adelaide suburbs

References

External links

, a 1997 film set in Maslin Beach

Suburbs of Adelaide
Beaches of South Australia